Walter Livingston (born September 12, 1934) is a former American football player who played with the Boston Patriots. He played college football at Heidelberg University.

References

1934 births
Living people
People from Ravenna, Ohio
Players of American football from Ohio
American football halfbacks
Heidelberg Student Princes football players
Boston Patriots players